Charles Bronson was an American powerviolence band from DeKalb, Illinois, active from 1994 to 1997.

Musical style 
The band borrowed from the early powerviolence of Infest. Lyrically, the group tended towards satirical commentary on the hardcore punk scene. The group has been described as a "fast, screaming mess of tall, skinny guys with a lot to say (which you would only know if you read the liner notes)". The group was sometimes criticized for its conceptual take on hardcore and art school tendencies, maintaining a long-standing feud with Felix Havoc of Code 13.
The band existed for only 3 years but members went on to form Los Crudos.

Discography

Albums 
Youth Attack! (1997) – Lengua Armada/Coalition Records
Complete Discocrappy 2xCD (2000) – Youth Attack Records

Demos and singles
Demo Tape (1994) – self-released
Charles Bronson (Diet Rootbeer) 7-inch (1995) – Six Weeks Records/Youth Attack Records
Charles Bronson / Spazz Split 7-inch (1995) – 625, Evil Noise and Disgruntled Records
Charles Bronson / Unanswered split 7-inch (1995) – Trackstar Records
Charles Bronson / Ice Nine split 7-inch (1996) – Bovine Records
Charles Bronson / Quill split 7-inch (1996) – Nat Records (Japan)

Compilations 
All That and a Bag o Dicks (1995) – Disgruntled Records
Double Dose of Dicks – Disgruntled Records
Speed Freaks (1995) – Knot Music
Vida Life (1996) – Lengua Armada
No Royalties (1996) – Bad People Records
Cry Now, Cry Later Vol. 4 (1996) – Pessimiser/Theologian
Another Probe 7-inch with a Girl on the Cover (1996) – Probe
El Guapo (1996) – Same Day Records
Possessed to Skate (1996) – 625 and Pessimiser Records
Deadly Encounters (1997) – Agitate 96 and Kill Music Records
Bllleeeeaaauuurrrrgghhh! A Music War (1997) – Slap A Ham Records
Reality 3 (1997) – Deep Six Records
Tomorrow will be Worse (1997) – Sound Pollution Records
Mandatory Marathon (1997) – Amendment Records
Hurt Your Feelings (2001) – Six Weeks Records
Chicago's on Fire Again (2001) – Lengua Armada
Skeletal Festival (2003) – self-released

References

External links 
Charles Bronson's MySpace

Hardcore punk groups from Illinois
Musical groups established in 1994
Musical groups disestablished in 1997
Musical groups from Illinois
Powerviolence groups
1994 establishments in Illinois